Altomédia is a Canadian media company, which publishes several French-language community weekly newspapers in the Central and Southwestern regions of Ontario for the Franco-Ontarian community. The company's publications include Le Métropolitain in the Greater Toronto Area, L'Action in London, Le Rempart in Windsor and Le Régional in Hamilton-Niagara, as well as Bonjour Ontario, a monthly magazine which reprints content from the weekly publications for distribution outside the company's primary service area.

The company's president is Denis Poirier.

The company was honoured by the Franco-Ontarian Economic Development and Employability Network in 2003 as one of the province's best small and medium businesses serving the province's francophone community, particularly for its advances in electronic production.

L'Action
Published in London, L'Action serves much of Southwestern Ontario apart from the Windsor market, which is served by sister publication Le Rempart.

Le Métropolitain
Le Métropolitain, serving the Greater Toronto Area, was launched in 1983 in Toronto, by Claude Badière, a former sales representative of L'Express de Toronto.

In 2018, the competing publication L'Express was advised by the Canadian Internet Registration Authority to stop using the web domain name lemetropolitain.ca; Le Métropolitain's web domain is lemetropolitain.com.

Le Régional
Le Régional serves the Hamilton market.

Le Rempart
Le Rempart was launched in 1966 by the local Windsor chapter of the Société Saint-Jean-Baptiste. It was acquired by Les Publications des Grands Lacs in 1972, and operated under the editorship of Jean Mongenais until it was acquired by Poirier in 2002.

References

External links
 Altomédia

Newspaper companies of Canada
Companies based in Brampton
French-language media in Ontario